, also known as , ,  or , was a Japanese anime director and screenwriter.

Biography
Dezaki started out as a manga artist while still in high school. In 1963 he joined Mushi Production, which was founded by manga and anime pioneer Osamu Tezuka. He made his debut as a director in 1970 with Ashita no Joe.

After working with Mushi Production, Dezaki co-founded Madhouse with Masao Maruyama, Rintaro, and Yoshiaki Kawajiri.

Dezaki was known for his distinct visual style, which makes use of split screen, stark lighting, extensive use of dutch angle, and pastel freeze frames that he called "postcard memories", which may be his most famous trademark. They feature a process whereby the screen fades into a detailed "painting" of the simpler original animation. Many of his techniques became popular and came to be seen as special techniques of Japanese animation. He particularly influenced Yoshiaki Kawajiri, Yoshiyuki Tomino, Ryūtarō Nakamura, Noriyuki Abe, Kunihiko Ikuhara, Akiyuki Shinbo, and Yutaka Yamamoto.

His older brother, Satoshi Dezaki, is also an anime director.

Dezaki was a notorious chain smoker, and as a result, he died from lung cancer on April 17, 2011, at the age of 67.

Works

Television series

Television specials

Original video animations

Movies

References

External links
 

"Interview: Osamu Dezaki" -(Animerica, issue #17 1998)

1943 births
People from Shinagawa
2011 deaths
Anime directors
Anime screenwriters
Deaths from lung cancer in Japan
Japanese animators
Japanese animated film directors
Japanese animated film producers
Osamu Tezuka